Abdul Azim bin Rahim (born 1 January 1997) is a Malaysian professional footballer who plays as a forward for Malaysia M3 League club Immigration.

Career statistics

Club

References

External links
 

1997 births
Living people
Malaysian footballers
Felcra FC players
Felda United F.C. players
Petaling Jaya Rangers F.C. players
Kuala Lumpur City F.C. players
Penang F.C. players
Malaysia Super League players
Malaysian people of Malay descent
Association football forwards